Aberdeen F.C. competed in the Scottish Premier League, Scottish League Cup and Scottish Cup in season 2000–01.

Results

Scottish Premier League

Final standings

Scottish League Cup

Scottish Cup

UEFA Cup

Players

Squad

Players out on loan

References

 AFC Heritage Trust

Aberdeen F.C. seasons
Aberdeen